Zignoëlla is a genus of fungi within the Chaetosphaeriaceae family.

The genus was circumscribed by Pier Andrea Saccardo in Michelia vol.1 on page 346 in 1878.

The genus name of Zignoëlla is in honour of Achille de Zigno (1813–1892), who was an Italian geologist and Paleo-botanist. He was economically independent. He worked in Padua, he became interested in botany (cryptogams and Algae), before looking at geology and palaeontology in Vienna.

Species

Species with authors are accepted by Species Fungorum;

Zignoëlla abscondita 
Zignoëlla acervata
Zignoëlla adjuncta
Zignoëlla albocincta
Zignoëlla algaphila 
Zignoëlla anceps 
Zignoëlla annonicola 
Zignoëlla antarctica
Zignoëlla arengae 
Zignoëlla arthopyrenioides
Zignoëlla astrocaryi
Zignoëlla australica
Zignoëlla australis
Zignoëlla bizzozeriana
Zignoëlla boreella
Zignoëlla buettneri
Zignoëlla caesalpiniae 
Zignoëlla campi-silii
Zignoëlla cariosa
Zignoëlla casaresiana 
Zignoëlla cascarillae 
Zignoëlla claypolensis 
Zignoëlla collabens 
Zignoëlla conica
Zignoëlla cryptarum
Zignoëlla culmicola
Zignoëlla dealbata 
Zignoëlla dolichospora 
Zignoëlla duvauicola 
Zignoëlla ebuli
Zignoëlla erumpens
Zignoëlla eumorpha
Zignoëlla eutypoides 
Zignoëlla exigua
Zignoëlla faginea 
Zignoëlla fallaciosa
Zignoëlla fallax 
Zignoëlla fraxinicola
Zignoëlla fuegiana
Zignoëlla garciniae 
Zignoëlla hanburiana
Zignoëlla haynaldii
Zignoëlla hederae
Zignoëlla herbana
Zignoëlla hysterioides 
Zignoëlla ignobilis
Zignoëlla ijuhensis
Zignoëlla immersa
Zignoëlla improvisa
Zignoëlla incerta
Zignoëlla inflata
Zignoëlla insueta 
Zignoëlla intermedia
Zignoëlla interspersa
Zignoëlla iranica 
Zignoëlla jurana
Zignoëlla latericolla
Zignoëlla lentzkeana 
Zignoëlla leptosperma
Zignoëlla lichenoidea 
Zignoëlla ligustrina
Zignoëlla longispora
Zignoëlla lonicerina
Zignoëlla lortoniana 
Zignoëlla macrasca 
Zignoëlla macrospora 
Zignoëlla magnoliae 
Zignoëlla maingayi
Zignoëlla matthiolae
Zignoëlla megalospora
Zignoëlla milleri 
Zignoëlla minutissima
Zignoëlla morthieri 
Zignoëlla naumovii 
Zignoëlla nematasca
Zignoëlla nitidula
Zignoëlla nobilis 
Zignoëlla nucivora 
Zignoëlla omphalostoma
Zignoëlla ossaea 
Zignoëlla ostiolata 
Zignoëlla oudemansii
Zignoëlla pachyspora 
Zignoëlla paecilostoma 
Zignoëlla palmicola 
Zignoëlla papillata
Zignoëlla patagonica
Zignoëlla physocarpi 
Zignoëlla piceae 
Zignoëlla pluriseptata 
Zignoëlla populicola
Zignoëlla populina
Zignoëlla potentillae 
Zignoëlla punctiformis
Zignoëlla querceti
Zignoëlla ramenticola
Zignoëlla rhodobapha 
Zignoëlla rhodostacheos 
Zignoëlla rhois 
Zignoëlla rhytidodes 
Zignoëlla rorippae 
Zignoëlla rubi 
Zignoëlla rugosa
Zignoëlla sabalina 
Zignoëlla salicicola
Zignoëlla scalaris
Zignoëlla segregata
Zignoëlla senegalensis
Zignoëlla sequanica
Zignoëlla seriata 
Zignoëlla sexnucleata
Zignoëlla sharifi 
Zignoëlla sideritidis 
Zignoëlla sinapisperma 
Zignoëlla sociabilis
Zignoëlla soluta
Zignoëlla somala 
Zignoëlla sphaeroides 
Zignoëlla subantarctica 
Zignoëlla subferruginea
Zignoëlla subtilissima 
Zignoëlla subvestita
Zignoëlla superficialis 
Zignoëlla texticola 
Zignoëlla tingens
Zignoëlla torpedo 
Zignoëlla translucens
Zignoëlla truncata 
Zignoëlla tuberculata 
Zignoëlla ulmi
Zignoëlla verrucarioides
Zignoëlla vincentii
Zignoëlla yerbae 

Former species;

 Z. abietis  = Chaetosphaeria abietis, Chaetosphaeriaceae family
 Z. archeri  = Nitschkia archeri, Nitschkiaceae
 Z. aterrima  = Kastanostachys aterrima, Stachybotryaceae
 Z. atriella  = Chaetosphaeria atriella, Chaetosphaeriaceae
 Z. britzelmayrii  = Trematosphaeria paradoxa, Trematosphaeriaceae
 Z. calospora  = Pontogeneia calospora, Sordariomycetes
 Z. collabens var. curreyi  = Zignoella collabens, Chaetosphaeriaceae
 Z. corticola  = Lophiostoma corticola, Lophiostomataceae
 Z. crustacea  = Chaetosphaeria crustacea, Chaetosphaeriaceae
 Z. cubensis  = Pontogeneia cubensis, Sordariomycetes
 Z. diaphana  = Exarmidium diaphanum, Hyponectriaceae
 Z. diaphana var. soluta  = Zignoella morthieri, Chaetosphaeriaceae
 Z. dubia  = Ceratostomella dubia, Boliniaceae
 Z. emergens  = Keissleriella emergens, Lentitheciaceae
 Z. enormis  = Pontogeneia enormis, Sordariomycetes
 Z. erumpens  = Didymella erumpens, Didymellaceae
 Z. excellens  = Exarmidium excellens, Hyponectriaceae
 Z. fusispora  = Trematosphaeria fusispora, Trematosphaeriaceae
 Z. gallica  = Chaetosphaeria gallica, Chaetosphaeriaceae
 Z. groenendalensis  = Brachysporium nigrum, Trichosphaeriaceae
 Z. insculpta  = Vialaea insculpta, Vialaeaceae
 Z. lichenoides  = Mycoglaena lichenoides, Dothideomycetes
 Z. lumbricoides  = Wallrothiella lumbricoides, Amplistromataceae
 Z. magnoliae var. brasiliensis  = Zignoella magnoliae, Chaetosphaeriaceae
 Z. mori  = Massarina mori, Massarinaceae
 Z. muelleri  = Leptosillia muelleri, Leptosilliaceae
 Z. nyssigena  = Anisomeridium polypori, Monoblastiaceae
 Z. obliqua  = Wallrothiella obliqua, Amplistromataceae
 Z. ordinata  = Ceratosphaeria ordinata, Ceratosphaeriaceae
 Z. ostioloidea  = Chaetosphaeria myriocarpa, Chaetosphaeriaceae
 Z. ovoidea  = Menispora glauca, Chaetosphaeriaceae
 Z. pallida  = Lophiotrema pallidum, Lophiostomataceae
 Z. paraguayensis  = Winterina paraguayensis, Nitschkiaceae
 Z. platani  = Wallrothiella platani, Amplistromataceae
 Z. populi  = Trichometasphaeria populi, Lophiostomataceae
 Z. prorumpens  = Melomastia prorumpens, Sordariomycetes
 Z. pulviscula  = Menispora caesia, Chaetosphaeriaceae
 Z. pygmaea  = Chaetosphaeria pygmaea, Chaetosphaeriaceae
 Z. sardoa  = Wallrothiella sardoa, Amplistromataceae
 Z. sequoiae  = Haematomyxa sequoiae, Ascomycota order
 Z. slaptonensis  = Leptosillia slaptonensis, Leptosilliaceae
 Z. somala var. calancalli  = Zignoella somala, Chaetosphaeriaceae
 Z. spissiana  = Wallrothiella spissiana, Amplistromataceae
 Z. subcorticale  = Wallrothiella subcorticalis, Amplistromataceae
 Z. transylvanica  = Saccardoella transylvanica, Sordariomycetes
 Z. valoniopsidis  = Pontogeneia valoniopsidis, Sordariomycetes
 Z. vitis  = Cucurbitaria vitis, Cucurbitariaceae
 Z. ybbsitzensis  = Trematosphaeria ybbsitzensis, Trematosphaeriaceae

References

External links

Sordariomycetes genera
Chaetosphaeriales
Taxa named by Pier Andrea Saccardo